Eric Thal (born August 10, 1965) is an American film and stage actor, perhaps best known as Ariel in Sidney Lumet's A Stranger Among Us; Sam Nivens in The Puppet Masters; Samson in Samson and Delilah; Meade Howell in The Wedding; and Rick in Six Degrees of Separation.

Youth 

Born in Niskayuna, New York, to Joan, a home-maker, and Herbert L. Thal, Jr., an electrical engineer, Thal, the youngest of five children, was raised on The Main Line of Philadelphia. He began performing as a magician and started studying acting at age 14, with Richard Brewer,  formerly of the Hedgerow Theatre. He graduated from The Haverford School and attended Lafayette College for one year, studying engineering and education, before moving to New York to pursue acting. He worked a variety of jobs including telemarketer, waiter, construction worker, janitor, and massage therapist, before being cast in his first film role in 1991.

Career 

Thal's film career started when Sidney Lumet cast him in the lead role of Ariel opposite Melanie Griffith, after he auditioned for a smaller role. The film, written by Robert J. Avarech, portrays a murder that takes place in a Hasidic community, with Thal playing the role of the son of The Rebbe. He went on to play Alex Perkins, opposite Penelope Ann Miller, in The Gun in Betty Lou's Handbag and the character Rick in the film Six Degrees of Separation, alongside Heather Graham and Will Smith.  Thal had no scenes with Donald Sutherland in Six Degrees of Separation, but went on to play the role of his son in The Puppet Masters,  directed by Stuart Orme. He also worked alongside Drew Barrymore, Jennifer Beals, James LeGros and Jon Stewart in Wishful Thinking.  He starred opposite Sarah Polley in Joe's So Mean to Josephine,  directed by Peter Wellington. He co-starred alongside Karyn Parsons and Isaiah Washington in Mixing Nia.  Other lead roles include Carl Heine, Jr. in Snow Falling on Cedars,  directed by Scott Hicks, and the role of Harry opposite Elliot Page in Mouth to Mouth.  He also appeared in the romantic comedy film The Good Guy,  which premièred at the Tribeca Film Festival.

Thal also appeared in a number of TV mini-series and shows. He starred opposite Elizabeth Hurley and alongside Dennis Hopper, Diana Rigg, and Michael Gambon in the TV movie Samson and Delilah.  He played opposite Halle Berry in the TV movie The Wedding,  produced by Oprah Winfrey, directed by Charles Burnett, and based on the book by Dorothy West. On February 16, 1998 Jet Magazine's cover featured Halle Berry between Thal and Carl Lumbly, with the title, "Halle Berry Must Choose Between A Black Man And White Man In TV Movie 'The Wedding.'"  Thal played Detective John Cahill in the unaired American pilot of Ultraviolet, which was produced by Howard Gordon and Chip Johannessen. He appeared in Law & Order: Special Victims Unit as Tommy Hedges, and twice in Law & Order: Criminal Intent as Didier Foucault (alias Dennis Dupont)  and Don Craddock. He was a guest star in the final episode of Hack,  alongside David Morse.

Thal originated the role of The Special Witness in Christopher Durang's Sex and Longing on Broadway at The Cort Theatre in 1996.

Filmography

Personal life 

Thal lives in New York City. He actively became interested in music in the 1990s and plays guitar, drums, and piano. He is the owner and founder of American English Master, and works as a dialect coach.

References

External links 

1965 births
Living people
Haverford School alumni
American male film actors
American male stage actors
20th-century American male actors
21st-century American male actors
People from Niskayuna, New York
Male actors from New York (state)
Lafayette College alumni